Jeshvaghan (also Romanized as Jeshvaghan; also known as Gashgūn and Haft Yārān) is a village in Tudeshk Rural District, Kuhpayeh District, Isfahan County, Isfahan Province, Iran. At the 2006 census, its population was 482, in 139 families.  
The original name of the village was Gashvagan which was later changed to Jeshvaghan.

References 

Populated places in Isfahan County